Lake Hood is a man-made recreational lake, located 6 km south-east of Tinwald in the locality of Huntingdon, Canterbury, New Zealand. It was opened in 2001 by the Right Honourable Jenny Shipley. It features an eight lane rowing course and separate waterskiing and jet skiing areas, and is home to Water Ski Lake Hood. It is increasing in popularity for rowing, as it is not as susceptible to wind as the main South Island rowing venue, Lake Ruataniwha.

Housing subdivision
A substantial housing subdivision, serving as a satellite suburb of Ashburton has been built surrounding the lake. The area is described as a rural settlement by Statistics New Zealand, and includes Huntingdon. The settlement is part of the larger Eiffelton statistical area. 

Lake Hood settlement had a population of 384 at the 2018 New Zealand census, an increase of 171 people (80.3%) since the 2013 census, and an increase of 312 people (433.3%) since the 2006 census. There were 135 households. There were 186 males and 195 females, giving a sex ratio of 0.95 males per female, with 90 people (23.4%) aged under 15 years, 45 (11.7%) aged 15 to 29, 198 (51.6%) aged 30 to 64, and 51 (13.3%) aged 65 or older.

Ethnicities were 99.2% European/Pākehā, 4.7% Māori, 0.8% Asian, and 0.8% other ethnicities (totals add to more than 100% since people could identify with multiple ethnicities).

Although some people objected to giving their religion, 42.2% had no religion and 52.3% were Christian.

Of those at least 15 years old, 60 (20.4%) people had a bachelor or higher degree, and 30 (10.2%) people had no formal qualifications. The employment status of those at least 15 was that 177 (60.2%) people were employed full-time and 66 (22.4%) were part-time.

References

External links

Hood, Lake